Jürgen Kurbjuhn (26 July 1940 – 15 March 2014) was a German football player.
Kurbjuhn had excelled as a youth-international for West Germany during his time with amateur club Buxtehuder SV and joined Hamburg's biggest, Hamburger SV, in 1960 when the club had just been crowned German football champion. In 1961 he was part of the Hamburg side reaching the semi-final of the European Cup against Barcelona and part of the 1963 German Cup winning side of the club. He retired, because of injury, after ten goals in 242 Bundesliga matches in 1972, mostly as a left back.

His West Germany career lasted five matches, between April 1962 and May 1966. He was unused by Sepp Herberger at the 1962 FIFA World Cup. He played his last international on 4 May 1966, when the West Germans beat Ireland 4–0 in a friendly. He was not selected for Helmut Schön's squad for the 1966 FIFA World Cup.

From 1988 he owned an insurance company in Buxtehude.

Honours
 UEFA Cup Winners' Cup finalist: 1967–68
 DFB-Pokal winner: 1963–63; finalist 1966–67

References

1940 births
2014 deaths
People from East Prussia
People from Tilsit
German footballers
Germany international footballers
Germany under-21 international footballers
Hamburger SV players
Bundesliga players
1962 FIFA World Cup players
Association football defenders
West German footballers
People from Buxtehude
Footballers from Lower Saxony